Syed Mohammad Shabbar Zaidi is a Pakistani chartered accountant who served as the 26th  Chairman of Federal Board of Revenue from May 2019 till April 2020. Previously, he served as a provincial Minister in the Government of Sindh during the 2013 caretaker setup. He was the territory partner of PwC Pakistan.

He is a fellow member of Institute of Chartered Accountants of Pakistan and also served as president of the Institute for 2005–2006.

He had been working with  A. F. Ferguson & Co., a member firm of PwC since 1969 and currently working as Senior Partner there. Among his non-profit work, he is a trustee of Sindh Institute of Urology & Transplantation (SIUT) and member of Boards of Governors of Liaquat National Hospital and Karachi School of Business and Leadership (KSBL).

In the past, he has also been the President of the Institute of Chartered Accountants of Pakistan and Chairman of the South Asian Federation of Accountants (SAFA). Syed Shabbar Zaidi has also authored many books, including Panama Leaks – A Blessing in Disguise – Offshore Assets of Pakistani Citizens, A Journey for Clarity and Pakistan: Not a Failed State.

As a  Chairman of Federal Board of Revenue, he introduced the Asset Declaration Scheme, whose deadline was July 3, 2019, by any measure this scheme considered as most successful asset declaration program in the history of Pakistan.
He was removed from his post on 6 April 2020 succeeding Nausheen Javed Amjad as chairman FBR.

References

Living people
Provincial ministers of Sindh
Pakistani accountants
Year of birth missing (living people)